The black-chinned yuhina (Yuhina nigrimenta) is a bird species in the white-eye family Zosteropidae.

It is found in the Indian subcontinent from the Himalayas eastwards to contiguous hilly regions of Southeast Asia. The species ranges across Bangladesh, Bhutan, Cambodia, India, Laos, Myanmar, Nepal, Tibet and Thailand. Its natural habitats are subtropical or tropical moist lowland forests, as well as subtropical or tropical moist montane forests.

References

Collar, N. J. & Robson, C. 2007. Family Timaliidae (Babblers)  pp. 70 – 291 in; del Hoyo, J., Elliott, A. & Christie, D.A. eds. Handbook of the Birds of the World, Vol. 12. Picathartes to Tits and Chickadees. Lynx Edicions, Barcelona.

black-chinned yuhina
Birds of Nepal
Birds of Bhutan
Birds of Northeast India
Birds of China
Birds of Laos
Birds of Vietnam
black-chinned yuhina
black-chinned yuhina
Taxonomy articles created by Polbot